Marie Béatrice Umutesi (born 1959) is a Rwandan writer writing in French.

She was born in Byumba and studied sociology, going on to work in rural development. Considered a "moderate" Hutu, she was forced to flee to Kivu in the Democratic Republic of the Congo. In 1996, the refugee camps were attacked by the Rwandan Patriotic Front (the current ruling political party in Rwanda, led by President Paul Kagame), and she was forced to flee again. Umutesi settled in Belgium in 1998.

She wrote an account of her experiences in Fuir ou mourir au Zaire. Le vécu d'une réfugiée Rwandaise (English title: Surviving the Slaughter: The Ordeal of a Rwandan Refugee in Zaire).

In 2006, she wrote the article Is Reconciliation between Hutus and Tutsis Possible? for the Journal of International Affairs.

References 

1959 births
Living people
Hutu people
Rwandan writers
Rwandan writers in French
21st-century Rwandan women
21st-century women writers